Veggies may refer to:

 Vegetables, often called veggies
 Veggies, the characters in VeggieTales, an American series of children's films 
 Veggies of Nottingham, a catering company based in Nottingham, UK
 Casey Veggies (born 1993), American hip-hop recording artist